Burlington Historic District may refer to:

in the United States (by state)
Burlington-Harmony Hill Roads Historic District, Harwinton, Connecticut, listed on the National Register of Historic Places in Litchfield County, Connecticut
Burlington Historic District (Burlington, Kentucky), listed on the National Register of Historic Places in Boone County, Kentucky
Burlington Historic District (Burlington, New Jersey), listed on the National Register of Historic Places in Burlington County, New Jersey
Downtown Burlington Historic District, Burlington, North Carolina, listed on the National Register of Historic Places in Alamance County, North Carolina
Burlington Historic District (Burlington, West Virginia), listed on the National Register of Historic Places in Mineral County, West Virginia
Burlington Downtown Historic District, Burlington, Wisconsin, listed on the National Register of Historic Places in Racine County, Wisconsin

See also
Burlington (disambiguation)